Kathleen M. "Kate" Ebli (October 15, 1958 – January 2, 2011) was a Michigan state representative from the 56th district, serving from 2006 until 2010. She was a Democrat, Catholic, and member of the National Rifle Association.

Education and experience 
Ebli received her bachelor's degree in General Agriculture from Pennsylvania State University and her MBA from Oakland University in Michigan. She had a history as a local community advocate; as a businesswoman she worked for both Maclean Hunter and Comcast Cable Communications. Ebli served on the board for the River Raisin Center for the Arts, the Monroe Humane Society, and the Monroe YMCA. She belonged to the Veterans of Foreign Wars Ladies Auxiliary Post 1138 and St. Michael the Archangel Catholic Church.

Personal life 
She lived on a small farm in Frenchtown Township, Michigan, with her husband Nick, a retired United States Marine and Vietnam War veteran, and her daughter Victoria.

Electoral history
2008 Michigan State House Election for the 56th District

2006 Michigan State House Election for the 56th District

References

2011 deaths
1958 births
Democratic Party members of the Michigan House of Representatives
Penn State College of Agricultural Sciences alumni
Oakland University alumni
People from Monroe County, Michigan
Women state legislators in Michigan
21st-century American politicians
21st-century American women politicians